Agapostemon sericeus, the silky striped-sweat bee, is a species of sweat bee in the family Halictidae.

Nesting biology

This solitary species is not choosy about nesting sites, including moist lawns surrounded by gardens and unmowed areas, as long as flowers are available.

References

Further reading

External links

 

sericeus
Articles created by Qbugbot
Insects described in 1771